Rizzoli is an Italian surname.

People
Achilles Rizzoli (1896–1981), an American artist
Angelo Rizzoli (1889–1970), an Italian publisher
 RCS MediaGroup, formerly "A. Rizzoli & C." and "Rizzoli Editore", a publishing company founded by Angelo Rizzoli and previously called Rizzoli-Corriere della Sera. Owner of the brand Rizzoli in non-book publishing
 Rizzoli Libri and Rizzoli Education, publishing divisions acquired by Arnoldo Mondadori Editore from RCS MediaGroup. The division owned the branding rights of Rizzoli in books
 Rizzoli Bookstore, Mondadori's bookstore in New York City, previously owned by Rizzoli Libri's subsidiary
 Rizzoli, Rizzoli Electa,   (BUR), Rizzoli Lizard, Rizzoli Etas, imprints of Arnoldo Mondadori Editore via Rizzoli Libri and other divisions
Anna Maria Rizzoli (born 1953), an Italian actress
Francesco Rizzoli (1809–1880), an Italian physician and politician
Giovanni Pietro Rizzoli (Giampietrino), an Italian Renaissance painter
Nicola Rizzoli (born 1971), an Italian football referee
Pasquale Rizzoli (1871–1953) Italian sculptor

Fictional characters 
Jane Rizzoli, the main character in a crime novel series by Tess Gerritsen
Rizzoli & Isles, a 2010 American crime drama television series airing on TNT, based on Gerritsen's novels

See also